Billycart Kids is an Australian company who make and distribute billycarts.

Etymology
The term "billycart" originates from the Australian billygoat-pulled cart of the 1880s.  Originally, a simple platform with four wheels and a moveable front steering column, the billycart was adapted to become a self-powered vehicle which children would race; the challenge being, to travel as fast and/or far as possible with the least initial momentum.

Construction
Using timber from Australian renewable forests, this current model billycart has four wheels, a fixed rear axle and a steerable front beam axle, actuated by a hand held rope.  The seat area is enclosed; designed for both safety and aesthetics.

Unpowered, the billycart is designed to be pushed by a friend or run down a suitable slope.  Users of this particular model claim Linear Park in Adelaide may be the perfect track.

Company
Billycart Kids employs Orana at their Port Pirie factory to hand drill, route and hand paint each piece to make every billycart unique.
Billycart Kids claim to be the only company in the world to ship this kind of product to consumers.  The billycart comes as a flat pack and requires assembly.

Events
On 28 March 2010, Billycart Kids sponsored the first Sodexo Roxby Billycart Bash, in Roxby Downs.  The event saw over a hundred downhill racers hurtle down the only hill in town in homemade or purchased billycarts.  The event raised money for the Roxby Downs Health Service Auxiliary.

Models
2010 model
The Hudson Flyer

Models in production
The Hudson Hornett

See also

List of South Australian manufacturing businesses

References

External links 
 BillycartKids.com
  Billycart Kids on Facebook

Physical activity and dexterity toys
Racing vehicles
Toy companies of Australia
Manufacturing companies based in Adelaide
Year of establishment missing